Shaykh Muhammad Alíy-i-Qá'iní (born in Birjand in 1277 AH (1860–1861 AD); died 1924 AD (1341 AH?)) was the nephew of Nabíl-i-Akbar (Mullá Muhammad-i-Qá'iní), another apostle of Baháʼu'lláh. As a young man engaged in religious studies in Mashhad, he encountered the Baháʼí Faith and soon became an ardent believer. He became a close companion of his uncle Nabíl until the latter's death in 1892. In 1903, Shaykh Muhammad Alí was instructed to accompany Mírzá Hasan-i-Adíb to India, but on the he was caught up in the persecution against the Baháʼís in Isfahán. He was stripped of his clothes, severely beaten and fortunate to escape with his life. He had to return to Tihrán, but later reached India and stayed there for a year and a half. He then traveled to Haifa. There ʻAbdu'l-Bahá sent him to Ishqábád to take care of the education of children there. Apart from journeys he made for the service of the faith, he stayed in Ishqábád for the rest of his life. After the death of Mírzá Abu'l-Faḍl, Shaykh Muhammad Alí was called to Haifa to complete, with the help of others, the unfinished writings of Mírzá Abu'l-Faḍl, leaving for Ishqábád shortly before ʻAbdu'l-Bahá's death. Shaykh Muhammad Alí died in 1924 after a prolonged illness.

References 

1860s births
1924 deaths
Iranian Bahá'ís
20th-century Bahá'ís